Events in the year 2022 in Greenland.

Incumbents 
 Monarch – Margrethe II
 High Commissioner – Julie Præst Wilche
 Premier – Múte Bourup Egede

Events 
Ongoing — COVID-19 pandemic in Greenland

April 
 14 June – Whisky War: The Danish Foreign Ministry announces that it has reached a deal with Canada to divide the long-disputed Hans Island in the Arctic in half between Canada's Nunavut territory and Greenland.

Sports 
 18 July – 13 August: 2022 Greenlandic Football Championship

Deaths 

 26 June – Thue Christiansen, 82, Greenlandic visual artist and politician, designer of the flag of Greenland and minister of education (1979–1983)
 4 September – Hendrik Nielsen, 80, Greenlandic politician, MP (1979–1991)

References 

 
2020s in Greenland
Years of the 21st century in Greenland
Greenland
Greenland